Arcturus is a rural locality in the Central Highlands Region, Queensland, Australia.

Geography 
The land use in Arcturus is a mixture of cropping and grazing on native vegetation.

Economy
There are a number of homesteads in the locality:
 Adelong
 Arcturus Downs
 Bambar
 Boongulla
 Cowley
 Crystal Plains
 Den-Lo-Park
 Erskinville
 Goonoo
 Kelso
 Kilmore
 Koala Creek
 Kolane
 Milroy Downs
 Moorooloo
 Mostyndale
 Oasis
 Pengarra
 Pinnacle
 Shalimar
 Springton
 Tarana
 Turkey Creek
 Wallalee
 Willoughby
 Wyntoon

History

References 

Central Highlands Region
Localities in Queensland